Tatyana Shcherbak (born 22 October 1997) is a Russian footballer who plays for Krasnodar and the Russia national team.

She played for Russia at UEFA Women's Euro 2017.

References

External links
 

1997 births
Living people
Russian women's footballers
Russia women's international footballers
Kubanochka Krasnodar players
Women's association football goalkeepers
Universiade medalists in football
Universiade bronze medalists for Russia
WFC Krasnodar players
Russian people of Ukrainian descent
WFC Lokomotiv Moscow players
Russian Women's Football Championship players
UEFA Women's Euro 2017 players